Acrobasis alexandra is a species of snout moth in the genus Acrobasis. It was described by Roesler and Küppers, in 1981. It is found on Sumatra.

References

Moths described in 1981
Acrobasis
Moths of Asia